The 2008-09 Biathlon World Cup - World Cup 1 was the opening event of the season and has been held in Östersund, Sweden. From Wednesday December 3 until Sunday December 7, 2008.

Schedule of events
The schedule of the event is below

Medal winners

Men

Women

References

Biathlon World Cup - World Cup 1, 2008-09
Sports competitions in Östersund
Biathlon competitions in Sweden
2008 in Swedish sport
December 2008 sports events in Europe